The Ex-Wife is a British drama thriller television miniseries based on Jess Ryder's book of the same name that premiered on 12 October 2022, on Paramount+. The series stars Céline Buckens, Tom Mison, Janet Montgomery, Jordan Stephens, Clare Foster, Adam Drew and Sam Hoare. The series consisted of four episodes. All episodes were directed by Brian O'Malley. The book was adapted to TV by Downton Abbey's Catherine Steadman.

Premise
The series follows a young woman, Tasha (Céline Buckens) who is married to middle-aged Jack (Tom Mison). Their marriage appears happy, but Tasha is haunted by Jack's ex-wife, Jen (Janet Montgomery). However, as the plot unfolds, the true villain appears not to be Jen.

Cast and characters

Main
 Céline Buckens as Natasha (Tasha), a young woman, Jack's second wife, who returns home one day to find out that her daughter Emily and husband Jack have disappeared.
 Tom Mison as Jack, Tasha's husband. He was previously married to Jen. He and Tasha have one daughter together, Emily.
 Janet Montgomery as Jen, Jack's ex-wife. Although she and Jack split up, she keeps on coming to their house frequently, and is asked by Jack's sister to be godparent to her child together with Jack, which upsets Tasha. When Jack and Emily disappear, she is reluctantly asked for help by Tasha.
 Jordan Stephens as Sam, Tasha's friend, with whom she had a sexual relationship in the past.
 Clare Foster as Hayley, Jack's sister. She misbehaves with Tasha, who endures it for the sake of the family.

Recurring
 Adam Drew as Toby
 Amro Mahmoud as Darren
 Rebecka Johnston as nursery manager
 Sam Hoare as Johnny
 Sam Bell as nursery worker
 Roderick Hill as Officer Warren
 Abe Jarman Officer Clarke 
 Nina Singh as Lola
 Daniel Bellus as Alex
 Dylan Baldwin as I.O. Berry
 James Lailey as Simon

Production

Casting
It was first announced that Céline Buckens would play the main role of Tasha. On 25 April 2022 it was announced that Tom Mison, Janet Montgomery and Jordan Stephens would join the cast as Tasha's husband Jack, Jack's ex-wife Jen and Tasha's old friend Sam, respectively. Executive producer Mike Benson commented upon the announcement: "We are absolutely delighted Tom, Janet and Jordan have joined the project alongside the brilliant Celine Buckens – our international cast have incredible experience and credits behind them. I’m sure they will inject a real nuance and complexity to a drama where nothing is quite what it seems."

Filming
Though set in London, England, the miniseries was shot in Budapest, Hungary. Filming began on 10 April 2022 in Budapest, set to wrap later in the Spring, for a total of six weeks of filming.

Release
The miniseries premiered on Paramount+ on 12 October 2022.

References

External links
 

English-language television shows
2020s British drama television series
2022 British television series debuts
2022 British television series endings
Paramount+ original programming
Television series about families
Television series set in the 2020s
Television shows filmed in Hungary
Television shows set in London